Mitrobryum is a genus of moss in family Dicranaceae. 

It contains the following species (but this list may be incomplete):

 Mitrobryum koelzii, H.Rob.

Dicranales
Taxonomy articles created by Polbot
Moss genera